The Djado Plateau lies in the Sahara, in northeastern Niger. It is known for its cave art (often of large mammals long since absent from the area), but is now largely uninhabited, with abandoned towns and forts still standing and visible. As of 2011, the commune of Djado had a total population of 1,495 people.

World Heritage Status 
This site was added to the UNESCO World Heritage Tentative List on May 26, 2006, in the Cultural category due to its universal cultural significance.

Djado City
Long ago abandoned by the Kanuri people who may have been the original founders. Before the abandonment of Djado city, the area was well known for its salt and date production. Now, the salt mines in Djado are rarely used, however there are date palms of the area that are tended by Toubou nomads

See also
Dao Timmi

References

External links
 Plateau et Fortin du Djado - UNESCO World Heritage Centre

Plateaus of Africa
Landforms of Niger
Tuareg
Communes of Niger
Former populated places in Niger
Sahara